Strahinj (in older sources also Strohinj) is a village in the Municipality of Naklo in the Upper Carniola region of Slovenia.

Church

The local church is dedicated to Saint Nicholas.

References

External links

Strahinj on Geopedia

Populated places in the Municipality of Naklo